Bairdfjellet is a mountain in Sabine Land at Spitsbergen, Svalbard. It has a height of 857 m.a.s.l. and is situated between the glaciers of Hayesbreen and Fimbulisen/Rabotbreen.

Name

The mountain is named after American naturalist Spencer Fullerton Baird.

References

Mountains of Spitsbergen